Maryam Sadeghi is an Iranian-born Canadian computer scientist and businesswoman in the field of medical image analysis.

Early life and education 
Sadeghi was born in 1980 in Mianeh, East Azerbaijan, Iran. She completed an undergraduate degree in computer hardware engineering at the Iran University of Science and Technology before moving to Canada in 2007. 

Sadeghi holds a PhD in computing science from Simon Fraser University (SFU) in the area of medical image analysis. Her PhD thesis, titled Towards prevention and early diagnosis of skin cancer: computer-aided analysis of dermoscopy images, won the Doctoral Dissertation Award 2012 Honourable Mention from the Canadian Image Processing and Pattern Recognition Society (CIPPRS).

Research and career 
Sadeghi's company, MetaOptima, developed the MoleScope, a small microscope that works with smart phones to allow the tracking and monitoring of skin moles. Sadeghi (currently the CEO) co-founded this company with her husband, Majid Razmara (who serves as the chief technology officer). MoleScope is a consumer-oriented device that has a magnification tool and a light source, along with a cloud-based platform that allows users to monitor suspicious growths through analysis and archiving of changes in size and colour. MetaOptima has over 70 employees based in Canada, Australia and the US. It has also developed a Derm-Engine platform which utilizes artificial intelligence to analyze and classify skin lesions. Derm-Engine received a 2019 Ingenious Small Private Sector Award.

Sadeghi was also part of a team that developed UVCanada—a free public health education app for sun protection.

Awards and honours 
 WaveFront's Wireless Prize package ($40,000) in the BCIC-New Ventures Competition in 2013
 Prize in the Plug & Play Silicon Valley competition in Vancouver, British Columbia, in July 2014.
 SFU Dean's Convocation Medal, 2012.
 Nominee, YWCA Women of Distinction Award, 2016.
 Winner, Business in Vancouver Forty under 40, 2016.

References 

Canadian computer scientists
Canadian businesspeople
Simon Fraser University alumni
Date of birth missing (living people)
Iranian computer scientists
Iran University of Science and Technology alumni
Iranian women scientists
21st-century Canadian women scientists
21st-century Canadian scientists
1980 births
Living people
Iranian emigrants to Canada